Sourabh Raaj Jain (born 1 December 1985) is an Indian actor in Hindi television. He gained a household name with his portrayal of Lord Krishna in Mahabharat (2013–2014), that met with nationwide acclaim and proved to be a "game-changer" for him. His portrayal of Lord Vishnu in Devon Ke Dev...Mahadev and Lord Shiva in Mahakali — Anth Hi Aarambh Hai also received critical appraisal. 

Other notable television shows to his credit include Kasamh Se, Uttaran, Chandragupta Maurya and Patiala Babes. Jain has participated in the reality shows Nach Baliye 9 (2019) and Khatron Ke Khiladi 11 (2021).

Personal life
Sourabh married Riddhima Jain in 2010, after three years of dating. They have participated together in the show Nach Baliye 9. The couple became parents to twins Hrishika and Hrishiv on 21 August 2017.

Filmography

Films

Radio

Television

Web series

Music videos

Awards and achievements

References

External links
Saurabh Raj Jain on IMDb

Living people
Indian male television actors
Male actors from New Delhi
1985 births
Fear Factor: Khatron Ke Khiladi participants